Gunnar "Gustaf" Månsson (March 1, 1885 – December 21, 1976) was a Swedish sailor who competed in the 1912 Summer Olympics. He was a crew member of the Swedish boat R. S. Y. C., which finished fifth in the 8 metre class competition.

References

External links
profile

1885 births
1976 deaths
Swedish male sailors (sport)
Sailors at the 1912 Summer Olympics – 8 Metre
Olympic sailors of Sweden